The 1928 Winter Olympics medal table is a list of National Olympic Committee's nations ranked by the number of medals won during the 1928 Winter Olympics, held in St. Moritz, Switzerland from February 11 to February 19, 1928. A total of 464 athletes from 25 countries participated in these Games, competing in 14 events in 6 disciplines.

Two gold medals, no silver medals and three bronze medals were awarded in the men's 500 metres speed skating event as a result of a two-way tie for first place and three-way tie for third place.

Medal table

The medal table is based on information provided by the International Olympic Committee (IOC) and is consistent with IOC convention in its published medal tables. By default, the table is ordered by the number of gold medals the athletes from a nation have won (in this context, a nation is an entity represented by a National Olympic Committee). The number of silver medals is taken into consideration next and then the number of bronze medals. If nations are still tied, equal ranking is given and they are listed alphabetically.

References

External links
 
 
 
 

Medal table
Winter Olympics medal tables